Giacomo Carini (born 2 July 1997) is an Italian swimmer.  He competed at the 2020 Summer Olympics, in 200 m butterfly.

Career 
He competed in the men's 100 metre butterfly event at the 2017 World Aquatics Championships. In 2014, he won the bronze medal in the boys' 200 metre butterfly at the 2014 Summer Youth Olympics held in Nanjing, China.

References

External links
 

1997 births
Living people
Italian male swimmers
Swimmers at the 2014 Summer Youth Olympics
Swimmers at the 2015 European Games
European Games medalists in swimming
European Games silver medalists for Italy
Italian male butterfly swimmers
Swimmers at the 2020 Summer Olympics
Olympic swimmers of Italy
20th-century Italian people
21st-century Italian people